National One (last season known as National League 1 and previously known before September 2009 as National Division Two), is the third of three national leagues in the domestic rugby union competition of England. It was known as Courage League National Division Three when founded in 1987. Caldy are the current champions. 

The Rugby Football Union (RFU) approved a new structure for the National Leagues from the 2022–23 season. This division will be reduced to fourteen teams, playing each other on a home and away basis to make a total of 26 matches each.
The champions are promoted to the RFU Championship and the bottom three teams are relegated to either National Two East, National Two North or National Two West depending on the geographical location of the team. There will be a two-week break over Christmas and protected weekend breaks through the season. The competition structure will be reviewed every three years.

Structure
The league consists of fourteen teams, with all the teams playing each other on a home and away basis, to make a total of twenty-six matches each. There is one promotion place, with the champions promoted to the RFU Championship, and there are three relegation places to either, National League 2 East, National League 2 North or National League 2 West, depending on the geographical location of the team. 

The results of the matches contribute points to the league table as follows:
 4 points are awarded for a win
 2 points are awarded for a draw
 0 points are awarded for a loss, however
 1 losing (bonus) point is awarded to a team that loses a match by 7 points or fewer
 1 additional (bonus) point is awarded to a team scoring 4 tries or more in a match.

2022–23

Participating teams and locations

League table

History
When the Rugby union leagues were introduced in 1987 the division was known as Courage League National Division Three. Ten years later, in 1997, the league was restructured and the Premiership was introduced, which consisted of the top two divisions. Therefore, National 3 became the top league outside of the Premiership structure, and was renamed as National 1. In 2000–01 the Premiership was reduced to a single division and National 1 was renamed National 2. Following the formation of the professional RFU Championship in 2009 the league, once again, became known as National League 1, and is currently the lowest tier that is nationwide. The league has previously consisted of fourteen clubs, but from 2009–10 increased to sixteen before reducing to fourteen again ahead of the 2022–23 season. Only one team was promoted to the RFU Championship and between 2009–10 and 2019–20 three teams were relegated to either National League 2 North or National League 2 South depending on geographical location.

Summary of tier three format

Original teams
When the league system was formed in 1987, the following teams participated in the league, which was known as National 3. Thirty-three years on, only one team Plymouth Albion, are currently playing at this level. (Updated to 2019–20)
 Birmingham — now Birmingham & Solihull, playing in Midlands 4 West (South) (9th tier)
 Exeter — now playing in the Premiership (1st tier)
 Fylde — currently playing in National League 2 North (4th tier)
 Maidstone — now playing in London 3 South East (8th tier)
 Metropolitan Police — now playing in Surrey 3 (11th tier)
 Morley — now playing in North 1 East (6th tier)
 Nuneaton — now playing in Midlands Premier (6th tier)
 Plymouth Albion — currently playing in this division (3rd tier)
 Sheffield — now playing in Midlands Premier (6th tier)
 Vale of Lune — now playing in North 1 West (6th tier)
 Wakefield — no longer participating in league rugby having disbanded in 2004
 West Hartlepool — now playing in North 1 East (6th tier)

League results

National Division Three

National League One

National Division Two

National League One

Number of league titles

Coventry (3)
Otley (3)
Richmond (3)
Doncaster Knights (2)
Ealing Trailfinders (2)
Esher (2)
London Scottish (2)
Ampthill (1)
Bedford (1)
Bracknell (1)
Caldy (1)
Exeter (1)
Hartpury College (1)
Henley (1)
Jersey (1)
Moseley (1)
Orrell (1)
Penzance-Newlyn (1)
Plymouth Albion (1)
Sedgley Park (1)
Wakefield (1)
West Hartlepool (1)
Worcester (1)

Records
Note that all records are from 1996–97 season onwards as this is widely held as the dawn of professionalism across the English club game.  It also offers a better comparison between seasons as the division team numbers are roughly equal (for example when league rugby union first started in 1987–88 the Courage League National Division Three had only 12 teams playing 11 games each, compared to 16 teams in 1996–97 playing 30 games (home & away)).  Attendance records are from 2000 onwards unless otherwise specified.  All records are up to date up till the end of the 2019–20 season.

League records
 Most titles: 3
Otley (1992–93, 1999–00, 2007–08)
Coventry (1993–94, 1995–96, 2017–18)
Richmond (1991–92, 2015–16, 2019–20)
 Most times promoted from division: 4
Richmond (1991–92, 1995–96, 2015–16, 2019–20)
 Most times relegated from division: 4
Nuneaton (1991–92, 2004–05, 2007–08, 2009–10)
Most league points in a season: 148
Hartpury College (2016–17)
Least league points in a season: 0
West Hartlepool (2000–01), Manchester (2009–10)
Most points scored in a season: 1,455
Hartpury College (2016–17)
Least points scored in a season: 114
Manchester (2009–10)
Most points conceded in a season: 2,626
Manchester (2009–10) 
Least points conceded in a season: 299
Henley Hawks (1998–99) 
Best points difference (For/Against): 1,078
Esher (2009–10)
Worst points difference (For/Against): –2,512
Manchester (2009–10)
Most games won in a season: 30
Hartpury College (2016–17)
Most games lost in a season: 30
Manchester (2009–10) 
Most games drawn in a season: 4
Wharfedale (2005–06), Richmond (2012–13), Ampthill (2017–18)  
Most bonus points in a season: 28
Ealing Trailfinders (2014–15)
Hartpury College (2016–17)

Match records
 Largest home win: 
124 – 5 Wharfedale at home to Manchester on 26 September 2009 (2009–10)
 Largest away win: 
148 – 0 Esher away to Manchester on 5 September 2009 (2009–10)
 Most points scored in a match: 148
Esher away to Manchester on 5 September 2009 (2009–10)
Most tries scored in a match: 23
Blaydon away to Manchester on 19 September 2009 (2009–10)
Most conversions scored in a match: 19
Esher away to Manchester on 5 September 2009 (2009–10)
Most penalties scored in a match: 8
Esher at home to Preston Grasshoppers on 1 December 2001 (2001–02)
Stourbridge at home to Rosslyn Park on 25 October 2003 (2003–04)
Hartpury College at home to Rosslyn Park on 9 April 2016 (2015–16)
Rotherham Titans at home to Rosslyn Park on 15 September 2018 (2018–19)
Most drop kicks scored in a match: 3
Fylde away to Esher on 13 February 2016 (2015–16)

Player records
Most times top points scorer: 2
 Neil Hallett for Esher (2005–06, 2006–07)
Most times top try scorer:  3
 Phil Chesters for Ealing Trailfinders (2011–12, 2012–13, 2014–15)
Most points in a season:  399
 Sam Ulph for Esher (2009–10)
Most tries in a season:  42
 Phil Chesters for Ealing Trailfinders (2011–12)
Most points in a match:  51
 Sam Ulph for Esher away to Manchester on 5 September 2009 (2009–10)
Most tries in a match:  7
 Hugo Ellis for Rosslyn Park at home to Cambridge on 12 January 2013
Most conversions in a match:  18
 Sam Ulph for Esher away to Manchester on 5 September 2009 (2009–10)
Most penalties in a match:  8
 Jonathon Gregory for Esher at home to Preston Grasshoppers on 1 December 2001 (2001–02)
 Ben Harvey for Stourbridge at home to Rosslyn Park on 25 October 2003 (2003–04)
 Gareth Thompson for Hartpury College at home to Rosslyn Park on 9 April 2016 (2015–16)
 Alex Dolly for Rotherham Titans at home to Rosslyn Park on 15 September 2018 (2018–19)
Most drop kicks in a match: 3
 Chris Johnson for Fylde away to Esher on 13 February 2016 (2015–16)

Attendance records
 
Highest attendance (league game): 3,758
Coventry RFC at home to Hull Ionians on 28 April 2018 (2017–18)
Lowest attendance (league game): 50
West Hartlepool at home to Camberley on 31 March 2001 (2000–01)
Highest average attendance (club): 2,206
Jersey (2011–12)
Lowest average attendance (club): 180
Barking (2011–12)
Highest average attendance (season): 653 (2017–18)
Lowest average attendance (season): 463 (2004–05)

Top ten point scorers

(Bold denotes players still playing in National League 1)

Top ten try scorers

(Bold denotes players still playing in National League 1)

See also
 English rugby union system
 List of English rugby union stadiums by capacity

Notes

References

External links
 National Clubs Association for Leagues 1 and 2

 
Rugby union leagues in Europe
3
Recurring sporting events established in 1987
Sports leagues established in 1987
Professional sports leagues in the United Kingdom